Kelly Carrington born Kelly Hemberger is an American model and clothing designer. She is the founder and creative director of the luxury swimwear line, Éclairée. She was Playboy's October 2008 Playmate of the Month. She was also featured on the cover of the same issue. Her centerfold was photographed by Stephen Wayda.

At the time of her Playboy pictorial, she was attending the University of Florida. The magazine issue with her as a cover model had a headline advertising a pictorial of girls of the Big Ten Conference, which doesn't include the University of Florida. In a previous interview, she was misquoted as saying that she was on the cover because she was more attractive than any of the Big Ten women.

References

External links

1986 births
Living people
2000s Playboy Playmates
People from White Plains, New York
American fashion designers
American women fashion designers
University of Florida alumni
21st-century American women